Jamie Russell Vanderbeken (born August 23, 1987) is a British-Canadian professional basketball player for the Saint John Riptide of the National Basketball League of Canada (NBL). He played college basketball for Tyler Junior College and Iowa State.

High school career 
Vanderbeken attended Quinte Secondary School in Belleville, Ontario. He was considered one of the best high school players of his time in Canada and was ranked 148th nationally by Hoop Masters. He averaged 25.0 points, 12.1 rebounds and 4.2 blocks per game and earned regional honors in his final season with Quinte.

Collegiate career 
Vanderbeken initially played college basketball at Tyler Junior College in Tyler, Texas. He helped the team achieve a top 10 national rank and lifted them to their first outright conference title in 21 years as a sophomore. Vanderbeken was also invited to participate in the National Junior College Athletic Association (NJCAA) All-Star Game. He transferred to Iowa State in 2008. With the Cyclones, Vanderbeken quickly became one of the team's top shooters. However, he suffered multiple injuries early in his second season there, forcing him to redshirt his senior season. He returned for his final year, starting all 29 games and averaging 11.1 points, 5.5 rebounds and 1.7 blocks.

Professional career 
Vanderbeken has previously played for several teams from around the world, including the Bakersfield Jam, Panionios, Hebraica y Macabi, the Glasgow Rocks, Ottawa Skyhawks, and Saint John Mill Rats.

International career 
Vanderbeken was invited to try out for the Great Britain men's national basketball team for a chance to compete at the 2009 FIBA EuroBasket. Due to the fact that his mother was Scottish, he was allowed to hold British-Canadian dual citizenship and therefore represent Great Britain internationally. However, he never would appear after suffering a broken foot on his first day at training camp.

References

External links 
FIBA.com profile
Jamie Vanderbeken at RealGM

1987 births
Living people
Bakersfield Jam players
Canadian expatriate basketball people in the United States
Canadian men's basketball players
Canadian people of British descent
Glasgow Rocks players
Iowa State Cyclones men's basketball players
Ottawa SkyHawks players
Panionios B.C. players
Power forwards (basketball)
Saint John Mill Rats players
Sportspeople from Mississauga
Tyler Apaches men's basketball players
Basketball people from Ontario